Hoplolaimus is a genus of nematodes known commonly as lance nematodes. They are parasites of plants, and three species are pests of agricultural crops.

These nematodes are usually about 1 to 1.5 millimeters long; some reach 2 millimeters. They have large stylets with knobs shaped like anchors or tulips. The male has winglike folds around its tail, and the female has a short, rounded tail. Some species are amphimictic, with male and female individuals that reproduce sexually, while others are parthenogenetic, with females producing offspring without fertilization.

The genus includes ectoparasites, endoparasites, and semi-endoparasites. They feed on plant roots, some feeding externally, some burying only their heads in the roots, and some entering the roots to feed.

Damage can be manifested in the sloughing of the root cortices. The main agricultural pest species are H. columbus, H. galeatus, and H. magnistylus. H. columbus infects such crops as cotton, soybean, and corn. H. galeatus can be found in many crops, as well as many species of pine trees and grasses.

There are 29 described species in genus Hoplolaimus.

Species include:

Hoplolaimus abelmoschi
Hoplolaimus aegypti
Hoplolaimus aorolaimoides
Hoplolaimus californicus
Hoplolaimus capensis
Hoplolaimus casparus
Hoplolaimus cephalus
Hoplolaimus chambus
Hoplolaimus citri
Hoplolaimus clarissimus
Hoplolaimus columbus
Hoplolaimus concaudajuvencus
Hoplolaimus dimorphicus
Hoplolaimus dubius
Hoplolaimus galeatus
Hoplolaimus imphalensis
Hoplolaimus indicus
Hoplolaimus jalalabadiensis
Hoplolaimus magnistylus
Hoplolaimus pararobustus
Hoplolaimus puertoricensis
Hoplolaimus sacchari
Hoplolaimus seinhorsti
Hoplolaimus seshadrii
Hoplolaimus sheri
Hoplolaimus singhi
Hoplolaimus stephanus
Hoplolaimus tabacum
Hoplolaimus tylenchiformis
Hoplolaimus uniformis

References 

Tylenchida
Secernentea genera